Trachypepla anastrella is a species of moth in the family Oecophoridae. It is endemic to New Zealand and has been observed in the North and South Islands. Larvae are leaf litter feeders from the host plant Olearia fragrantissima and adults are on the wing from December until March.

Taxonomy 
This species was first described in 1883 by Edward Meyrick and named Trachypepla anastrella. Later that same year Meyrick gave another abbreviated description of the species. In 1884 Meyrick gave a much fuller description of T. anastrellla. In 1928 George Hudson discussed and illustrated this species. Hudson would go on to discuss and illustrate this species again in his 1939 publication and state that the description and illustration given in his 1928 publication related to Euchersadaula tristis. J. S. Dugdale confirmed that the 1928 illustration of that species by Hudson is of the species Euchersadaula tristis. The male lectotype specimen, collected in reserved bush and forest in Dunedin, is held at the Natural History Museum, London.

Description 

Meyrick described T. anastrella as follows:

Distribution
This species is endemic to New Zealand. It has been observed in the North and South Islands as well as on Mokopuna and Matiu / Somes Islands.

Behaviour
This species is on the wing from December until March.

Habitat and hosts

This species has been observed living in hind dune habitat on Kaitorete Spit. Larvae of this species feed on the  leaf litter of the "near threatened" plant species Olearia fragrantissima.

References 

Moths described in 1883
Oecophorinae
Moths of New Zealand
Endemic fauna of New Zealand
Taxa named by Edward Meyrick
Endemic moths of New Zealand